Etelä-Pohjalainen Osakunta (EPO) is one of the 15 student nations at the University of Helsinki, Finnish-speaking and established in 1908.

References

External links